Raimondo Feletti (1851-1927) was an Italian physician and zoologist.
 
Feletti worked at a clinic in Catania where a street is named for him "Via Raimondo Feletti".With Giovanni Batista Grassi he published several works on malarial parasites in birds. They described, and introduced the names Haemamoeba vivax (1890) and H. malariae (1889) for, two of the malaria parasites, soon revising the genus to Plasmodium. In 1889 Grassi and Feletti, as an honor to Laveran, proposed the genus name Laverania . It is now a subgenus of Plasmodium.

Works

With Grassi, B., 1889, 1890. Sui parassiti della malaria. Rif. Med. 6 : 62-64. (The 1889 paper was a preprint of the 1890 paper according to Hemming, 1954).
With Grassi, B., 1890. Parasites malariques chez les oiseaux. Arch. Ital. de Biologie 13 : 297-300.
With Grassi, B., 1892. Contribuzione allo studio die parassiti malarici. Atti Accad. Gioenia. Series 4,5 : 1-81.

References
Conci, C. & Poggi, R. 1996 Iconography of Italian Entomologists, with essential biographical data. Mem. Soc. Ent. Ital. 75 159-382, 418 Fig. 
Howard, L. O. 1930 History of applied Entomology (Somewhat Anecdotal). Smiths. Miscell. Coll. 84 X+1-564, 51 plates
Roncalli, Amici R 2001 The history of Italian parasitology. Vet. Parasitol. 98(1-3):3-30.

External links
Plasmodium malariae Nomenclature history and account
All about Malaria

20th-century Italian zoologists
Italian entomologists
1850s births
1927 deaths
Italian physicians